The 1578  took place following the sudden death of Uesugi Kenshin. Kenshin had requested that the inheritance be split between his nephew, Uesugi Kagekatsu, and his adopted son Uesugi Kagetora. This conflict happened because of neither heirs being born with the Uesugi name. Kagekatsu was the biological son of Nagao Masakage and Kagetora was biological son of Hojo Ujiyasu.

Before the situation could escalate into an armed conflict, Takeda Katsuyori acted as the mediator between those two. Therefore, eventually the Uesugi was divided for a military conflict. The Takeda supported Kagekatsu and the Hojo supported Kagetora.

Thus, on March 17, 1578, Uesugi Kagekatsu led a force from his castle at Kasugayama to besiege Otate castle . Kagetora tried to return to Odawara but committed seppuku in Samegao Castle, and Kagekatsu claimed the full inheritance.

Uesugi retainers who supported Kagekatsu 

 Honjo Shigenaga
 Naoe Kanetsugu
 Jojo Masashige
 Saito Tomonobu
 Yasuda Akimoto
 Yoshie Munenobu
 Ogita Nagashige

 Irobe Nagazane 
 Shibata Naganori
 Shibata Shigeie
 Suibara Chikanori
 Takenomata Yoshitsuna

Uesugi retainers who supported Kagetora 

 Uesugi Norimasa
 Aya Gozen
 Uesugi Kagenobu
 Saiponji Kagenaga
 Saiponji Sadanaga
 Kanamari Chikatsuna
 Kawada Nagachika
 Kaji Hidetsuna
 Momoi Yoshitaka
 Kitajō Takahiro
 Kitajō Hirotaka
 Ayukawa Morinaga

See also 

 Aya-Gozen
Naoe Kanetsugu

References

Otate 1578
Otate 1578
1578 in Japan
Conflicts in 1578